A trunking gateway is an interface between Voice over Internet Protocol (VoIP) and Public switched telephone network (PSTN).   It is a device whereby the VoIP line and PSTN line are connected so that an end user can use PSTN phones to make a call over VoIP.

Voice over IP